The Nikon AF-S Zoom-Nikkor 24-120mm 3.5-5.6G IF-ED VR is a standard zoom lens produced by Nikon Corporation. These are commonly sold as the kit lens for the Nikon D700. It contains two ED glass elements.

See also
List of Nikon compatible lenses with integrated autofocus-motor

References

Nikon F-mount lenses